Eero "Käkä" Milonoff (born 1 May 1980) is a Finnish actor. He graduated from the Helsinki Theatre Academy in 2005, and he works as a freelance actor. In 2008, he was nominated for the Jussi Award for Best Actor for his role in the biopic Ganes (2007) as the drummer and vocalist Remu Aaltonen of the rock band Hurriganes.

Personal life 
Milonoff is of German, Russian, and Swedish descent on his father's side. His father is the theatre and film director Pekka Milonoff, and he has three brothers: Aleksi, Juho, and Tuomas, of whom the latter two also work in the film and television industry.

Filmography

References

External links 
 
 

1980 births
Living people
Male actors from Helsinki
Finnish male film actors
Finnish male television actors
Finnish people of German descent
Finnish people of Russian descent
Finnish people of German-Russian descent
Finnish people of Swedish descent
Best Supporting Actor Guldbagge Award winners